Mazzin (Ladin: Mazin) is a comune (municipality) in Trentino in the northern Italian region Trentino-Alto Adige/Südtirol, located about 60 km northeast of Trento.

In the census of 2001, 381 inhabitants out of 440 (86.6%) declared Ladin as their native language.
 
Mazzin borders the following municipalities: Canazei, Campitello di Fassa, Tiers and Sèn Jan di Fassa.

References

Cities and towns in Trentino-Alto Adige/Südtirol